The Epstein–Barr virus (EBV), formally called Human gammaherpesvirus 4, is one of the nine known human herpesvirus types in the herpes family, and is one of the most common viruses in humans. EBV is a double-stranded DNA virus.

The virus causes infectious mononucleosis ("mono" or "glandular fever"). It is also associated with various non-malignant, premalignant, and malignant Epstein–Barr virus-associated lymphoproliferative diseases such as Burkitt lymphoma, hemophagocytic lymphohistiocytosis, and Hodgkin's lymphoma; non-lymphoid malignancies such as gastric cancer and nasopharyngeal carcinoma; and conditions associated with human immunodeficiency virus such as hairy leukoplakia and central nervous system lymphomas. The virus is also associated with the childhood disorders of Alice in Wonderland syndrome and acute cerebellar ataxia and, by some evidence, higher risks of developing certain autoimmune diseases, especially dermatomyositis, systemic lupus erythematosus, rheumatoid arthritis, and Sjögren's syndrome. About 200,000 cancer cases globally per year are thought to be attributable to EBV. In 2022, a large study (population of 10 million over 20 years) suggested EBV as the leading cause of multiple sclerosis, with a recent EBV infection causing a 32-fold increase in the risk of developing multiple sclerosis.

Infection with EBV occurs by the oral transfer of saliva and genital secretions.
Most people become infected with EBV and gain adaptive immunity. In the United States, about half of all five-year-old children and about 90% of adults have evidence of previous infection. Infants become susceptible to EBV as soon as maternal antibody protection disappears. Many children become infected with EBV, and these infections usually cause no symptoms or are indistinguishable from the other mild, brief illnesses of childhood. In the United States and other developed countries, many people are not infected with EBV in their childhood years. When infection with EBV occurs during adolescence or young adulthood, it causes infectious mononucleosis 35 to 50% of the time.

EBV infects B cells of the immune system and epithelial cells. Once EBV's initial lytic infection is brought under control, EBV latency persists in the individual's memory B cells for the rest of their life.

Virology

Structure and genome
The virus is about 122–180 nm in diameter and is composed of a double helix of deoxyribonucleic acid (DNA) which contains about 172,000 base pairs encoding 85 genes. The DNA is surrounded by a protein nucleocapsid, which is surrounded by a tegument made of protein, which in turn is surrounded by an  envelope containing both lipids and surface projections of glycoproteins, which are essential to infection of the host cell. In July 2020, a team of researchers reported the first complete atomic model of the nucleocapsid of the virus. This "first complete atomic model [includes] the icosahedral capsid, the capsid-associated tegument complex (CATC) and the dodecameric portal--the viral genome translocation apparatus."

Tropism
The term viral tropism refers to which cell types that EBV infects. EBV can infect different cell types, including B cells and epithelial cells.

The viral three-part glycoprotein complexes of gHgL gp42 mediate B cell membrane fusion; although the two-part complexes of gHgL mediate epithelial cell membrane fusion. EBV that are made in the B cells have low numbers of gHgLgp42 complexes, because these three-part complexes interact with Human-leukocyte-antigen class II molecules present in B cells in the endoplasmic reticulum and are degraded. In contrast, EBV from epithelial cells are rich in the three-part complexes because these cells do not normally contain HLA class II molecules. As a consequence, EBV made from B cells are more infectious to epithelial cells, and EBV made from epithelial cells are more infectious to B cells.  Viruses lacking the gp42 portion are able to bind to human B cells, but unable to infect.

Replication cycle

Entry to the cell
EBV can infect both B cells and epithelial cells. The mechanisms for entering these two cells are different.

To enter B cells, viral glycoprotein gp350 binds to cellular receptor CD21 (also known as CR2). Then, viral glycoprotein gp42 interacts with cellular MHC class II molecules. This triggers fusion of the viral envelope with the cell membrane, allowing EBV to enter the B cell. Human CD35, also known as complement receptor 1 (CR1), is an additional attachment factor for gp350/220, and can provide a route for entry of EBV into CD21-negative cells, including immature B-cells. EBV infection downregulates expression of CD35.

To enter epithelial cells, viral protein BMRF-2  interacts with cellular β1 integrins. Then, viral protein gH/gL interacts with cellular αvβ6/αvβ8 integrins. This triggers fusion of the viral envelope with the epithelial cell membrane, allowing EBV to enter the epithelial cell. Unlike B-cell entry, epithelial-cell entry is actually impeded by viral glycoprotein gp42.

Once EBV enters the cell, the viral capsid dissolves and the viral genome is transported to the cell nucleus.

Lytic replication
The lytic cycle, or productive infection, results in the production of infectious virions. EBV can undergo lytic replication in both B cells and epithelial cells. In B cells, lytic replication normally only takes place after reactivation from latency. In epithelial cells, lytic replication often directly follows viral entry.

For lytic replication to occur, the viral genome must be linear. The latent EBV genome is circular, so it must linearize in the process of lytic reactivation. During lytic replication, viral DNA polymerase is responsible for copying the viral genome. This contrasts with latency, in which host-cell DNA polymerase copies the viral genome.

Lytic gene products are produced in three consecutive stages: immediate-early, early, and late.
Immediate-early lytic gene products act as transactivators, enhancing the expression of later lytic genes. Immediate-early lytic gene products include BZLF1 (also known as Zta, EB1, associated with its product gene ZEBRA) and BRLF1 (associated with its product gene Rta).
Early lytic gene products have many more functions, such as replication, metabolism, and blockade of antigen processing. Early lytic gene products include BNLF2.
Finally, late lytic gene products tend to be proteins with structural roles, such as VCA, which forms the viral capsid. Other late lytic gene products, such as BCRF1, help EBV evade the immune system.

EGCG, a polyphenol in green tea, has shown in a study to inhibit EBV spontaneous lytic infection at the DNA, gene transcription, and protein levels in a time- and dose-dependent manner; the expression of EBV lytic genes Zta, Rta, and early antigen complex EA-D (induced by Rta), however, the highly stable EBNA-1 gene found across all stages of EBV infection is unaffected.   Specific inhibitors (to the pathways) suggest that Ras/MEK/MAPK pathway contributes to EBV lytic infection though BZLF1 and PI3-K pathway through BRLF1, the latter completely abrogating the ability of a BRLF1 adenovirus vector to induce the lytic form of EBV infection.  Additionally, the activation of some genes but not others is being studied to determine just how to induce immune destruction of latently infected B-cells by use of either TPA or sodium butyrate.

Latency
Unlike lytic replication, latency does not result in production of virions.
Instead, the EBV genome circular DNA resides in the cell nucleus as an episome and is copied by cellular DNA polymerase.
Epigenetic changes such as DNA methylation and cellular chromatin constituents, suppress the majority of the viral genes in latently infected cells. Only a portion of EBV's genes are expressed, which support the latent state of the virus.
Latent EBV expresses its genes in one of three patterns, known as latency programs. EBV can latently persist within B cells and epithelial cells, but different latency programs are possible in the two types of cell.

EBV can exhibit one of three latency programs: Latency I, Latency II, or Latency III. Each latency program leads to the production of a  limited, distinct set of viral proteins and viral RNAs.

Also, a program is postulated in which all viral protein expression is shut off (Latency 0).

Within B cells, all three latency programs are possible.
EBV latency within B cells usually progresses from Latency III to Latency II to Latency I. Each stage of latency uniquely influences B cell behavior. Upon infecting a resting naive B cell, EBV enters Latency III. The set of proteins and RNAs produced in Latency III transforms the B cell into a proliferating blast (also known as B cell activation).
Later, the virus restricts its gene expression and enters Latency II. The more limited set of proteins and RNAs produced in Latency II induces the B cell to differentiate into a memory B cell.
Finally, EBV restricts gene expression even further and enters Latency I. Expression of EBNA-1 allows the EBV genome to replicate when the memory B cell divides.

Within epithelial cells, only Latency II is possible.

In primary infection, EBV replicates in oropharyngeal epithelial cells and establishes Latency III, II, and I infections in B-lymphocytes. EBV latent infection of B-lymphocytes is necessary for virus persistence, subsequent replication in epithelial cells, and release of infectious virus into saliva. EBV Latency III and II infections of B-lymphocytes, Latency II infection of oral epithelial cells, and Latency II infection of NK- or T-cell can result in malignancies, marked by uniform EBV genome presence and gene expression.

Reactivation
Latent EBV in B cells can be reactivated to switch to lytic replication. This is known to happen in vivo, but what triggers it is not known precisely. In vitro, latent EBV in B cells can be reactivated by stimulating the B cell receptor, so it is likely reactivation in vivo takes place after latently infected B cells respond to unrelated infections.

Transformation of B-lymphocytes
When EBV infects B cells in vitro, lymphoblastoid cell lines eventually emerge that are capable of indefinite growth. The growth transformation of these cell lines is the consequence of viral protein expression.

EBNA-2, EBNA-3C, and LMP-1 are essential for transformation, whereas EBNA-LP and the EBERs are not.

Following natural infection with EBV, the virus is thought to execute some or all of its repertoire of gene expression programs to establish a persistent infection. Given the initial absence of host immunity, the lytic cycle produces large numbers of virions to infect other (presumably) B-lymphocytes within the host.

The latent programs reprogram and subvert infected B-lymphocytes to proliferate and bring infected cells to the sites at which the virus presumably persists. Eventually, when host immunity develops, the virus persists by turning off most (or possibly all) of its genes with some of the reprogramming becoming permanent, only occasionally reactivating to produce fresh virions. A balance is eventually struck between occasional viral reactivation and host immune surveillance removing cells that activate viral gene expression. The manipulation of the human body's epigenetics by EBV can alter the genome of the cell to leave oncogenic phenotypes. As a result the modification by the EBV increases the hosts likelihood of developing EBV related cancer. EBV related cancers are unique in that they are frequent to making epigenetic changes but are less likely to mutate.

The site of persistence of EBV may be bone marrow. EBV-positive patients who have had their own bone marrow replaced with bone marrow from an EBV-negative donor are found to be EBV-negative after transplantation.

Latent antigens 
All EBV nuclear proteins are produced by alternative splicing of a transcript starting at either the Cp or Wp promoters at the left end of the genome (in the conventional nomenclature). The genes are ordered EBNA-LP/EBNA-2/EBNA-3A/EBNA-3B/EBNA-3C/EBNA-1 within the genome.

The initiation codon of the EBNA-LP coding region is created by an alternate splice of the nuclear protein transcript. In the absence of this initiation codon, EBNA-2/EBNA-3A/EBNA-3B/EBNA-3C/EBNA-1 will be expressed depending on which of these genes is alternatively spliced into the transcript.

Protein/genes

Subtypes of EBV
EBV can be divided into two major types, EBV type 1 and EBV type 2. These two subtypes have different EBNA-3 genes. As a result, the two subtypes differ in their transforming capabilities and reactivation ability. Type 1 is dominant throughout most of the world, but the two types are equally prevalent in Africa. One can distinguish EBV type 1 from EBV type 2 by cutting the viral genome with a restriction enzyme and comparing the resulting digestion patterns by gel electrophoresis.

Detection

Epstein–Barr virus-encoded small RNAs (EBERs) are by far the most abundant EBV products transcribed in cells infected by EBV. They are commonly used as targets for the detection of EBV in histological tissues.

Role in disease 
See also Infectious mononucleosis and the other diseases listed in this section

EBV causes infectious mononucleosis. Children infected with EBV have few symptoms or can appear asymptomatic, but when infection is delayed to adolescence or adulthood, it can cause fatigue, fever, inflamed throat, swollen lymph nodes in the neck, enlarged spleen, swollen liver, or rash. Post-infectious chronic fatigue syndrome has also been associated with EBV infection.

EBV has also been implicated in several other diseases, including Burkitt's lymphoma, hemophagocytic lymphohistiocytosis, Hodgkin's lymphoma, stomach cancer, nasopharyngeal carcinoma, multiple sclerosis, and lymphomatoid granulomatosis.

Specifically, EBV infected B-cells have been shown to reside within the brain lesions of multiple sclerosis patients, and a 2022 study of 10 million soldiers' historical blood samples showed that "Individuals who were not infected with the Epstein-Barr virus virtually never get multiple sclerosis. It's only after Epstein-Barr virus infection that the risk of multiple sclerosis jumps up by over 30-fold," and that only EBV of many infections had such a clear connection with the disease.

Additional diseases that have been linked to EBV include Gianotti–Crosti syndrome, erythema multiforme, acute genital ulcers, and oral hairy leukoplakia. The viral infection is also associated with, and often contributes to the development of, a wide range of non-malignant lymphoproliferative diseases such  as severe hypersensitivity mosquito bite allergy reactions, Epstein-Barr virus-positive mucocutaneous ulcers, and hydroa vacciniforme as well as malignant lymphoproliferative diseases such as Epstein–Barr virus-positive Burkitt lymphoma, Epstein–Barr virus-positive Hodgkin lymphoma, and primary effusion lymphoma.

The Epstein–Barr virus has been implicated  in disorders related to alpha-synuclein aggregation (e.g. Parkinson's disease, dementia with Lewy bodies, and multiple system atrophy).

History 

The Epstein–Barr virus was named after Michael Anthony Epstein, and Yvonne Barr, who discovered the virus together with Bert Achong. In 1961, Epstein, a pathologist and expert electron microscopist, attended a lecture on "The Commonest Children's Cancer in Tropical Africa—A Hitherto Unrecognised Syndrome" by Denis Parsons Burkitt, a surgeon practicing in Uganda, in which Burkitt described the "endemic variant" (pediatric form) of the disease that bears his name. In 1963, a specimen was sent from Uganda to Middlesex Hospital to be cultured. Virus particles were identified in the cultured cells, and the results were published in The Lancet in 1964 by Epstein, Achong, and Barr. Cell lines were sent to Werner and Gertrude Henle at the Children's Hospital of Philadelphia who developed serological markers. In 1967, a technician in their laboratory developed mononucleosis and they were able to compare a stored serum sample, showing that antibodies to the virus developed. In 1968, they discovered that EBV can directly immortalize B cells after infection, mimicking some forms of EBV-related infections, and confirmed the link between the virus and infectious mononucleosis.

Research
As a relatively complex virus, EBV is not yet fully understood. Laboratories around the world continue to study the virus and develop new ways to treat the diseases it causes. One popular way of studying EBV in vitro is to use bacterial artificial chromosomes. Epstein–Barr virus can be maintained and manipulated in the laboratory in continual latency (a property shared with Kaposi's sarcoma-associated herpesvirus, another of the eight human herpesviruses). Although many viruses are assumed to have this property during infection of their natural hosts, there is not an easily managed system for studying this part of the viral lifecycle.  Genomic studies of EBV have been able to explore lytic reactivation and regulation of the latent viral episome.

Although under active research, an Epstein–Barr virus vaccine is not yet available. The development of an effective vaccine could prevent up to 200,000 cancers globally per year. The absence of effective animal models is an obstacle to development of prophylactic and therapeutic vaccines against EBV.

Like other human herpesviruses Epstein-Barr might allow eradication via a course of the pro-drug valaciclovir, but further research is needed to determine if eradication is actually achievable. Antiviral agents act by inhibiting viral DNA replication, but there is little evidence that they are effective against Epstein–Barr virus. Moreover, they are expensive, risk causing resistance to antiviral agents, and (in 1% to 10% of cases) can cause unpleasant side effects.

See also 

 Epstein–Barr virus infection
 Epstein–Barr virus-associated lymphoproliferative diseases
 James Corson Niederman, the physician who proved how the Epstein–Barr virus is transmitted in infectious mononucleosis

References

Further reading

External links 
 
 
 Transcriptome and epigenome of EBV 

Betaherpesvirinae
 
 
IARC Group 1 carcinogens
Infectious causes of cancer
Viral diseases